Kim Jung-yoo (Korean: 김정유, born February 8, 1979), better known as MC Sniper (Korean: MC 스나이퍼), is a South Korean rapper. He is known for writing controversial lyrics that challenge social injustice and mainstream society. He was a contestant on Show Me the Money and a producer on both seasons of Tribe of Hip Hop. He released his first album, So Sniper..., on May 17, 2002.

Discography

Studio albums

Special albums

Extended plays

Charted singles

Awards and nominations

Mnet Asian Music Awards

|-
| 2002
| "BK Love"
| Best Hip Hop Performance
|

References

1979 births
Living people
South Korean male rappers
South Korean Buddhists